The 1998 Bank of Ireland All-Ireland Senior Football Championship was the 112th edition of the GAA's premier Gaelic football competition. The championship began on 3 May 1998 and ended on 27 September 1998.

Galway's 1-14 to 1-10 victory over Kildare in the All-Ireland final meant that the Sam Maguire Cup returned to the county and the province of Connacht for the first time since 1966. This was Galway's eighth All-Ireland triumph in all. Kildare, managed by Mick O'Dwyer, had defeated the 1995 champions Dublin and the 1996 champions Meath to win their first Leinster title since 1956, before defeating the 1997 champions Kerry in the All-Ireland semi-final.

Format

The Ulster, Munster, Leinster and Connacht championships were conducted as straight knock-out competitions. The Munster football championship for the 2nd year running had Kerry, Cork and Clare as byes to the semi-finals while Limerick, Tipperary and Waterford played a lone-first-round game with the bye team in a lone quarter final.  The winners of each provincial competition went on to play in the All Ireland semi-finals.

Results

Connacht Senior Football Championship

Quarter-finals

Semi-finals

Finals

Leinster Senior Football Championship

First round

Second round

Quarter-finals

Semi-finals

Final

Munster Senior Football Championship

First round

Quarter-final

Semi-finals

Final

Ulster Senior Football Championship

Preliminary round

Quarter-finals

Semi-final

Final

All-Ireland Senior Football Championship

Semi-finals

Final

Championship statistics

Miscellaneous

 Kildare win the Leinster Championship for the first time since 1956, and reach their first All Ireland final since 1935.
 The Galway-Derry All Ireland semi-final was the first meeting of them.
 Galway won the All Ireland title for 1st in 32 years also were the first Connacht team since then to do so.

Top scorers

Overall

Single game

All-Ireland Senior Football Championship